is a sub-kilometer asteroid, classified as a near-Earth object and potentially hazardous asteroid of the Aten group. It was discovered 8 December 1998, by the Lincoln Near-Earth Asteroid Research at Lincoln Laboratory's Experimental Test Site, and was found to have frequent approaches to the Earth, Venus, and Mercury.

Orbit 
For comparison, the distance to the Moon is about 0.0026 AU (384,400 km).

From 1993 to 1998,  was the asteroid with the lowest known aphelion at 1.023 AU, and was thus the closest thing to an Apohele asteroid known at the time. However,  lost its smallest aphelion title almost immediately when  (aphelion of 1.014 AU) was discovered only a few weeks later on 8 December 1998.

The Jupiter Tisserand invariant, used to distinguish different kinds of orbits, is 7.7.

References

External links 
 
 
 

415713
415713
415713
415713
415713
19981208